Brijmangal Rai was a freedom fighter who established several educational institution after the independence in district Ghazipur. Being an important political leader of ruling Congress party, it was very easy for him to garner political favour or to grab some powerful post in Uttar Pradesh government. However he opted for social services only, living a life of yogi, not accepting even the pension of freedom fighters.

Early life
Born in a Bhumihar farming family in village Khardiha of district Ghazipur of Uttar Pradesh, Brijmangal Rai was a very brilliant student. In the year 1926 A.D. he passed 6th standard from Karimuddinpur Middle School. However he couldn't complete his education due to his devotion to the motherland. In a very tender age he got influenced by Mahatma Gandhi and left his school to become a freedom fighter. Due to his perseverance, commitment and hard work he rose to prominence very quickly in the congress sangathan. At the age of only 22 years he was nominated as mandal secretary of Congress sangathan.  Hence inviting attention of oppressive and brutal British government agencies, he had to go underground for several years. In spite of many raids and tip-offs he could not get arrested. But he was not inactive in all those years. Police started harassing his family and sealed his house, which lock got opened only after the independence. British government terminated the services of his younger brother Brijnath Rai, who was working as market inspector in those days. But Brijmangal Rai didn't get deviated from his path. His only dream was to see the motherland free of British subjugation.

Freedom fighter
In 1942 Quit India movement, Brijmangal Rai played an important role conducting organisational activities. He was served an arrest warrant within a week of spearheading the movement. But he got underground and was not arrested until four years. As a result, the entire property of his family was attached. In the year 1946 he was arrested but British Government was packing its bags from India. All the independence activists were being released, therefore all the charges were withdrawn against Brijmangal Rai and subsequently he was released.

Educationist

Brij Mangal Rai established Shri Sarvoday Inter College in Khardiha village in the year of 1952. He made Khardiha an educational center by establishing BTC training center and a Degree College. Due to his pioneering task thousand of rural youth got the opportunity for better education. Many of these student achieved greater heights in their professional career. It was Brijmangal Rai who identified the talented Hindi writer Veveki Rai and appointed him as a teacher in his newly founded secondary school. He was also instrumental in establishing Swami Sahajanand Post Graduate College in Ghazipur. He was treasurer of the management committee of the College.

Achievements
Although he never contested any assembly or Lok Sabha election but he ensured victory of congress candidate from his assembly constituency five continuous terms. Babu Vijay Shankar Singh (MLA) and Mantri Ji had excellent bonding and trust on each other. He served as member of Pradesh Congress Committee but he didn't ask for any political favour. He had close rapport with Sucheta Kriplani (Ex. Chief Minister of Uttar Pradesh) and Chandra Bhanu Gupta (also an Ex. CM of Uttar Pradesh). On his invitation Sucheta Kriplani visited his native place Khardiha and inaugurated Mahila Praudh Sikhsa Kendra along with BTC training center. Babu Brij Mangal Rai devoted his entire life for the betterment of rural people of Ghazipur district. That is why he is remembered as 'Malviya Ji' of Ghazipur.

Death and legacy
Brij Mangal rai was a devotee of Bhagwan Shiv. His lived a life of disciplined yogi. As a true Gandhian his attire was khadi dhoti only. Instead of dhoti he hardly wore any cloth in upper part of his body. Although being a political person he lived an unblemished or spotless life of 84 years. Due to disciplined life he never experienced health problem till the very old age. In these days lots of students of his school and colleges are getting retired from their jobs, but they all bow their heads in his respects. They admit that whatever they achieved in their life could become possible only because of the educational infrastructure established and developed by Brij Mangal Rai.

References

1914 births
People from Ghazipur 
1998 deaths
Indian independence activists from Uttar Pradesh